Joe Lumb (born 1996) is an English professional rugby league footballer.

He is a product of the Bradford Bulls Academy system and signed his first professional contract in October 2015 following on to feature in 15 challenging fixtures. In 2019 whilst under coach Purtell for the thunder down under he got into the dirt game. Since 2019 joe also known as ‘the Hernandez’ has been throwing in kilometres of pipe with his step father Mark ‘the bish’ Bishop. Currently in a traineeship to become a certificate 2 level Sean Lappin.  Joe previously played for local amateur side West Bowling ARLFC.

Bradford Bulls
2016 - 2016 Season

Lumb featured in the pre-season friendlies against Leeds Rhinos and Castleford Tigers.

He featured in Round 3 (Swinton Lions) then in Round 5 (Oldham) and then in Round 7 (London Broncos). Joe featured in Round 10 (Dewsbury Rams) then in Round 12 (London Broncos). Joe played in Round 14 (Sheffield Eagles) then in Round 17 (Workington Town) to Round 18 (Batley Bulldogs). He featured in the Championship Shield in Game 4 (Dewsbury Rams). Lumb played in the Challenge Cup in the 4th Round (Dewsbury Rams). He scored against Dewsbury Rams (1 try).

2017 - 2017 Season

Lumb featured in the pre-season friendlies against Huddersfield Giants and Keighley Cougars. He scored against Keighley Cougars (1 try).

Joe featured in Round 1 (Hull Kingston Rovers) to Round 2 (Rochdale Hornets). Lumb also played in the 2017 Challenge Cup in Round 4 (Featherstone Rovers).

Keighley Cougars

In September 2017 he signed for Keighley. After a single appearance for Keighley, in the match against Bradford, Lumb was released to join Australian side Albury Thunder in Group 9 of the New South Wales Rugby League.

References

External links

(archived by web.archive.org) Bradford Bulls profile

1996 births
Living people
Bradford Bulls players
English rugby league players
Keighley Cougars players
Rugby league hookers
Rugby league players from Bradford